The Roman Catholic Diocese of União da Vitória is a diocese located in the city of União da Vitória in the Ecclesiastical province of Curitiba in Brazil.

History
 December 3, 1976: Established as Diocese of União da Vitória from the Metropolitan Archdiocese of Curitiba, Diocese of Guarapuava and Diocese of Ponta Grossa

Leadership
 Bishops of União da Vitória (Roman rite)
 Bishop Walter Jorge Pinto (2019.03.30 -
 Bishop Agenor Girardi, M.S.C. (2015.05.06 – 2018.02.08)
 Bishop João Bosco Barbosa de Sousa, O.F.M. (2007.01.03 – 2014.04.16)
 Bishop Walter Michael Ebejer, O.P. (1976.12.03 – 2007.01.03)

References
 GCatholic.org
 Catholic Hierarchy

Roman Catholic dioceses in Brazil
Uniao da Vitoria, Roman Catholic Diocese of
Christian organizations established in 1976
Roman Catholic dioceses and prelatures established in the 20th century
1976 establishments in Brazil
União da Vitória